O9 or O-9 may refer to:

 USS O-9 (SS-70), an O-class submarine of the United States Navy
 O-9, the pay grade for the following senior officer ranks in the U.S. uniformed services:
 Lieutenant General in the Army, Marine Corps, Air Force, and Space Force
 Vice Admiral in the Navy, Coast Guard, Public Health Service Commissioned Corps, and NOAA Commissioned Officer Corps
 Douglas O-9, a variant of the Douglas O-2, a 1920s American observation aircraft
 O9 (model railways)
 Oregon-IX (OIX), an internet exchange; see List of Internet exchange points

See also

09 (disambiguation)
oix (disambiguation)